One of two towns in Kinta District, Perak, Malaysia.

District of Kerian, Northern Perak

Bukit Merah (Jawi: بوكيت ميره) is a town and a popular tourist destination. It is famous for the Bukit Merah Laketown Resort.

District of Kinta, Central Perak 

Bukit Merah (Jawi: بوكيت ميره) is a village with population of 11,000, located near Ipoh. In 1992 and again notably in 2011, it attracted attention for radioactive pollution and health problems due to rare-earth mining in the decade or more before the mine closed in 1992.

References

External links
Bukit Merah Laketown Resort

Kinta District
Towns in Perak
Villages in Perak